Le Grand, also spelled as Legrand, is an unincorporated community in Montgomery County, Alabama, United States. A post office operated under the name Legrand from 1883 to 1916.

Providence Presbyterian Church, which is located in Le Grand, is listed on the Alabama Register of Landmarks and Heritage.

References

Unincorporated communities in Montgomery County, Alabama
Unincorporated communities in Alabama